David Díaz may refer to:

David Díaz (boxer) (born 1976), Mexican American boxer
David Díaz (basketball) (born 1964), Venezuelan basketball player
David Díaz (illustrator) (born 1960), American illustrator
David Diaz-Infante, American football player